Waccamaw National Wildlife Refuge, established in 1997, is a recent addition to the United States National Wildlife Refuge system. It is located in parts of northeastern Georgetown County, South Carolina, southern Horry, and southeastern Marion counties, and contains lands adjacent to the Pee Dee River, the Little Pee Dee River, and the Waccamaw River near their confluence. Currently the size of the refuge is  but plans call for the total refuge to be over 50,000 acres (200 km2).

It was founded to preserve valuable undeveloped coastal wetland and adjacent uplands that provide habitats for many species of wildlife. Among the endangered species protected there is the red-cockaded woodpecker, whose habitat is primarily the longleaf pine forest on Sandy Island. This is also a nesting area for swallow-tailed kites and bald eagles.

The stated objectives of this refuge are:
Provide habitat for waterfowl, shorebirds, wading birds, raptors, neo-tropical migratory birds, and resident species.
Environmental education and interpretation.
Provide opportunities for hunting, fishing, and outdoor recreation.

The Refuge visitor center is located just north of Georgetown on Highway 701. It overlooks the Great Pee Dee River in the small community of Yauhannah, South Carolina.

See also
 Waccamaw River Heritage Preserve, a nature preserve further north along the same river

References

External links
Official refuge site

Protected areas of Georgetown County, South Carolina
Protected areas of Horry County, South Carolina
Protected areas of Marion County, South Carolina
National Wildlife Refuges in South Carolina
Nature centers in South Carolina
Wetlands of South Carolina
Landforms of Georgetown County, South Carolina
Landforms of Horry County, South Carolina
Landforms of Marion County, South Carolina
Protected areas established in 1997
1997 establishments in South Carolina